The Joret line (Norman: lène Joret) is an isogloss used in the linguistics of the . Dialects north and west of the line have preserved Vulgar Latin  and  before ; dialects south and east of the line have palatalized  and  before . The line was first identified by Charles Joret and published in 1883.

To the north and west of the line are found Picard and some dialects of Norman. To the south and the east lie other Oïl dialects including southern Norman, Walloon and French.

Geography
The Joret line extends from the Channel Islands (including Jèrriais, Guernésiais and Sercquiais) and across the continent from Granville, Manche to the linguistic border with Dutch in the North of France and Belgium. It runs approximately west to east through Normandy north of Granville and Villedieu-les-Poêles and divides Manche in two linguistically and separates Calvados and Orne along with Eure; then it curves progressively to the north and ends up approximately south to north in Picardy, where the line runs with the Amiénois and Thiérache, up to the west of Rebecq, Beaumont and Chimay in Belgium where it separates Picard from Walloon.

Examples
 Norman Picard  ~ Southern Norman, French , Walloon  (palatalization)

Latin cattu (cat) gave rise to  cat north of the line and  chat to the south.

Low Latin *captiare (to catch) gave rise to cachier / cacher (> English catch) north of the line and chasser (> English chase) to the south.

Low Latin *cantionem (song), Picard canchon West of the line, French chanson, Walloon tchinson South and East of the line. Similarly Latin cantare → canter vs. chanter, tchanter.

Frankish *pokka (bag) gave rise to  pouque (> English dial. poke) north of the line and pouche (> English pouch) to the south. French poche (pocket), Norman pouquette (> English pocket).

Latin candela (candle) gave rise to candelle north of the line and chandelle to the south.

Celtic *carros > Latin carrus gave rise to car (> English car) north of the line and char (wain, carriage), chariot (> English chariot) to the south. 

Celtic *kagio-, Gaulish caio- > Norman Picard kay, cay (> ME kay) > French quai (> English quay); Old French chay > French chai (wine cellar)
 
 Norman Picard  ~ Southern Norman, French , Walloon  (palatalization)

Latin gamba (leg) gave rise to  gambe north of the line and  jambe to the south, djambe to the East.

Frankish *gard- (yard) gave rise to gardin (> English garden) north of the line and jardin to the south. 

Late Latin *galleto > Norman Picard gal(l)on (> English gallon) ; Old French jallon , French jalon (measure)

Second isogloss 
Another effect of the palatalizations a bit further to the north but quite parallel was this:

Low Latin *captiare > Norman Picard  cacher, cachi(er) (> English catch); Southern Norman, French chasser

Low Latin ceresiu(m) > Norman Picard cherise, chrise, chise (> English cherry); Southern Norman srise French cerise

Third isogloss 
A third isogloss, marking a consonantal change unrelated to the others, more or less follows the Joret line throughout Normandy and continues through northeastern France. It includes all of Picardy, Wallonia, Champagne, Lorraine and a part of Burgundy.

Germanic  (sometimes Latin  was affected as well) was kept north of the line (written w or v), but became  (written g or gu) south of the line.

Northern French  ~ French 

Latin vespa / Frankish *waspa (wasp) > Picard Wespe, Norman Vêpe ~ French guêpe (wasp)

Frankish *wala hlaupan (S. English well and leap) > Picard, Old Norman waloper (> English wallop) ; French galoper (> English gallop)

Frankish wahtôn (S. English wake and watch) > Picard Old Norman wait(i)er (> English wait) ; Old French guaitier, French guetter

Frankish *werra > Old Picard Old Norman werre, warre (> English war) ; French guerre (war)

Toponymy 
The Joret line affects toponyms in Normandy and Picardy: Cambrai (corresponding to Chambray), Camembert, Carentan (corresponding to Charenton), Caen (Wace gallicized as Chaem).

Norman placenames derived from the Gallo-Romance word Campaniacum show initial C- in some cases (Campigny, north) and initial Ch- in others (Champigny-la-Futelaye, south).

See also
Norman language
Picard language
Walloon language

Notes

References
La Normandie dialectale  Lepelley, Caen 1999 

Oïl languages
Picardy
Normandy
Isoglosses
Norman language